This is a list of Gujarati language films that released in 2015. After the slowdown in previous years, Gujarati films earned  ₹ 55 crore in 2015.

Releases

January – March

April – June

July – September

October – December

References

External links
 List of Gujarati films of 2015 at the Internet Movie Database

2015
Gujarati
Gujarati